Caren Sonn, née Jung (born 18 January 1968 in Ulm) is a retired German hurdler.

She represented the sports club MTG Mannheim, and became German champion in 1995 and 1998. Her personal best time was 12.88 seconds, achieved in August 1997 in Bitburg.

Achievements

References

1968 births
Living people
German female hurdlers
Athletes (track and field) at the 1992 Summer Olympics
Olympic athletes of Germany
Sportspeople from Ulm
MTG Mannheim athletes